Angloromani or Anglo-Romani (literally "English Romani"; also known as Angloromany, Rummaness, or Pogadi Chib) is a mixed language of Indo European origin involving the presence of Romani vocabulary and syntax in the English used by descendants of Romanichal Travellers in the United Kingdom, Australia, Canada, New Zealand, United States, and South Africa.

After their arrival to Great Britain in the sixteenth century, Romani used the Romani language until the late nineteenth century (and perhaps a generation longer in Wales).  It was replaced by English as the everyday and family language of British Romani, leading to what is known as "Para-Romani" or the presence of Romani features in the English used by the Romani.

An example of a phrase in Angloromani is:
 ('The man was walking down the road with his horse')

This differs from the presence of loanwords (such as that used locally in Edinburgh and Northumberland) from the Romani language, such as lollipop  (originally a toffee apple), pal (originally Romani phral 'brother'), and chav (originally chavo 'boy').

Historical documentation of English Romani
A document from about the seventeenth century titled the Winchester Confessions indicates that British Romani was itself a dialect of the northern branch of Romani sharing a close similarity to Welsh Romani. However, the language in a modern context has changed from the Indic-based vocabulary, morphology, and influences from Greek and other Balkan languages of the seventeenth century to a Para-Romani dialect typical of modern Anglo-Romani with sentence endings influenced by English, while Welsh Romani retains the original grammatical system.

Historically, the variants of Welsh and English Romani constituted the same variant of Romani, share characteristics, and are historically closely related to dialects spoken in France, Germany (Sinti), Scandinavia, Spain, Poland, North Russia and the Baltic states.  Such dialects are descended from the first wave of Romani immigrants into western, northern and southern Europe in the late Middle Ages. Few documents survive into modern times, the Winchester Confessions document c.1616 highlights the variant of English Romani and contains a high number of words still used in the modern Northern European Romani dialects and until recently also Welsh Romani;  Examples include: balovas (pig meat bacon), lovina (beer, alcohol), ruk (tree), smentena (cream), boba (beans) and folaso (glove), and all such words occur in all western dialects of Romani, with few English loanwords present.

However, the Winchester Confessions document indicates that English grammatical structures were influencing speakers of English Romani (within a London context where the document was sourced) to adopt an (adjective-noun) configuration rather than the (noun-adjective) configuration of other Romani dialects, including modern Welsh Romani.  The document suggests a complete separation between Thieves' Cant, and the variant of English Romani of the early seventeenth century. This has particular implications when dating the origin and development of Anglo-Romani and its split from Welsh Romani. The author of one such study believes English Romani gradually lost its distinctive syntax, phonology and morphology while other scholars believe Anglo-Romani developed relatively quickly after the Romanis' arrival in England in the sixteenth century, in a development similar to the Pidgin or Creole languages.

Anglo-Romani was already developing in the seventeenth century although the change from the original English Romani is unclear. The Winchester Confessions document disproves a sudden morphological change, and lends support to a strict linguistic separation between a Canting language and English Romani whose speakers used a separate and distinct Romani language when speaking amongst themselves. A situation which existed one hundred years later as testified by James Poulter 1775: "the English Gypsies spoke a variant of their own language that none other could understand," indicating the language was distinct from the common "Canting tongue" of England. Romani of that time was a language of everyday communication, of practical use, and not a secret language.

The original Romani was used exclusively as a family or clan language, during occasional encounters between various Romani clans. It was not a written language, but more a conversational one, used by families to keep conversations amongst themselves in public places such as markets unintelligible to others. It was not used in any official capacity in schools or administrative matters, and so lacked the vocabulary for these terms. Such terms were simply borrowed from English. However, to keep the language undecipherable to outsiders, the Romani speakers coined new terms that were a combination or variation of the original English terms. Gradually, the British Romani began to give up their language in favour of English, though they retained much of the vocabulary, which they now use occasionally in English conversation – as Angloromani.

The origins of the Romani language are in India, and the core of the vocabulary and grammar still resemble modern Indic languages like Hindi, Kashmiri, and Punjabi.  Linguists have been investigating the dialects of Romani since the second half of the eighteenth century, and although there are no ancient written records of the language, it has been possible to reconstruct the development of Romani from the medieval languages of India to its present forms as spoken in Europe.  Although the language remains similar at its core, it is sometimes quite difficult for Romani people from different regions to understand one another if they have not had any exposure to other dialects before.

Intertwining
Anglo-Romani is a creole language, with the base languages being Romani and English (something referred to as Para-Romani in Romani linguistics).

Some English lexical items that are archaic or only used in idiomatic expressions in Standard English survive in Anglo-Romani, for example moniker and swaddling.

Every region where Angloromani is spoken is characterised by a distinct colloquial English style; this often leads outsiders to believe that the speech of Romanichals is regional English.  The distinct rhotic pronunciation of the Southern Angloromani variety also means that many outsiders perceive Southern Romanichal Travellers to be from the West Country because West Country English is also rhotic. Indeed, many Romanichal Travellers from the South of England or the Midlands region have a slightly West Country sounding accent; in fact it is a Southern Romanichal Traveller accent.

Dialectal variation
Among Anglo-Romani speakers, there is variation depending on where groups originally settled before learning English:

 Southern Angloromani (Spoken across the Southwest, Southeast, East Anglia, West Midlands, East Midlands and South Wales).
 Northern Angloramani (Spoken across the Northwest, Northeast, Yorkshire, Northeast Wales and Scottish Borders).

The members of these groups consider that not only do their dialects/accents differ, but also that they are of different regional groups.  The speakers of Southern Angloromani took the regional identity of Southern Romanichal Travellers and the speakers of Northern Angloromani took the regional identity of Northern Romanichal Travellers.  At the time of settlement, these divisions were somewhat reflective of geographic location. They did travel, but until travel became modernized, the migrations were relatively local.

Phonology and syntax
Overall, Anglo-Romani consonants reflect the standard British English consonantal system with the exception that the rhotic is trilled  and /x/ appears in certain dialects.

Romani allowed for two word orders – Subject-Verb-Object (SVO) and Verb-Subject-Object (VSO).

Negation in Anglo-Romani is achieved through the use of the word kek:
  ('I can't do it')
  ('there's no water left in this bucket')

"Be" is optionally deleted:
  ('you are a fine-looking man')
  ('you are a pretty lady')

Reduplication is employed for emphasis:
  ('distant')
  ('very distant')

Morphology
In the sixteenth century, the Romani language was an inflected language, employing two genders, plurality and case marking.

Anglo-Romani is first referenced in 1566–1567.

In the late nineteenth century, Romani personal pronouns became inconsistently marked, according to Leland, who also notes that case distinction began fading overall, and gender marking also disappeared. George Borrow notes that in 1874, some Romani speakers were still employing complete inflection, while some were adopting the English syntax with a Romani lexicon.  It seems to be around 1876 that gender distinction was no longer seen; however, the continued use of Romani plural forms was noted, along with English verb conjugation.  By 1923, some plural endings were still being used on nouns, but English prepositions were used instead of Romani postpositions. Current usage has lost almost all Romani morphology and instead uses English morphology with Romani lexical items.

Samples of Angloromani
The Anglo-Romani Project, an initiative of the Romani community of Blackburn and the Lancashire Traveller Education Service, has samples of Anglo-Romani conversation as well as documentation, which it has collected with the aim of documenting the Anglo-Romani lexicon in its regional and dialectal variation. Samples of conversation and their meaning can be found on their website.

Some common phrases

Comparison of Angloromani, European Romani, Indic languages and English

Swadesh list

See also 
 Polari

References

Further reading
 Acton, Thomas. 1989. The Value of “Creolized” Dialects of Romanes. In International Symposium Romani Language and Culture. Sarajevo.
 Acton, Thomas and Gerwyn Davis. 1979. Educational Policy and Language Use Among English Romanies and Irish Travellers (Tinkers) in England and Wales. International Journal of the Sociology of Language 19-22: 91-110.
 Acton, Thomas, Vangelis Marselos, and Laszlo Szego. 2000. The Development of Literary Dialects of Romanes, and the Prospects for an International Standard Dialect. In Language, Blacks, and Gypsies, ed. Thomas Acton and Morgan Dalphinis. London: Whiting and Birch.
 Borrow, George. 1923. Romano Lavo-Lil. London: Hazell, Watson, and Viney, Ld.
 Deterding, David. 1997. The formants of monophthong vowels in Standard Southern British English pronunciation. Journal of the International Phonetic Association 27: 47-55.
 Hancock, Ian. 1996. Duty and Beauty, Possession and Truth: The Claim of Lexical Impoverishment as Control. In Gypsies: A book of interdisciplinary readings, ed. Diane Tong. New York: Garland Publishers.
 "Anglo-Romani" University of Washington US
 Manchester University Romani Project ROMANI Project - Manchester

External links
 Speakromany.com a project from English Gypsies reviving their language
  Distribution of Romani dialect by region
 AngloRomani Linguistic Information

Immigrant languages of the United States
Languages of the United Kingdom 
Languages of Australia
Romani in Australia
Romani in the United Kingdom
Romani in the United States
Para-Romani
Languages of South Africa
Articles with permanently dead external links
Languages of New Zealand
English-based pidgins and creoles